Alfred Radke (born 9 October 1934) is a German sports shooter. He competed in the men's 25 metre rapid fire pistol event at the 1984 Summer Olympics.

References

1934 births
Living people
German male sport shooters
Olympic shooters of West Germany
Shooters at the 1984 Summer Olympics
Sportspeople from Berlin